Back in the Day is a 2016 American sports drama film directed by Paul Borghese and starring William DeMeo, Michael Madsen and Alec Baldwin.

Cast
William DeMeo as Anthony
Michael Madsen as Enzo
Alec Baldwin as Gino Fratelli
Mike Tyson as himself
Annabella Sciorra as Mary
Shannen Doherty as Maria
Danny Glover as Eddie "Rocks" Travor
Manny Pérez as Jose
Larry Merchant as himself
Lillo Brancato Jr. as Nicky

References

External links
 

American sports drama films
Films scored by Randy Edelman
2010s English-language films
2010s American films